William Simba (born 26 March 2001) is a Belgian professional footballer who plays as a centre-back for Belgian First Division B side Club NXT.

References 

2001 births
Living people
Belgian footballers
Black Belgian sportspeople
Association football central defenders
Royal Excel Mouscron players
Club NXT players
Challenger Pro League players